() is a Russian patriotic song. It was the anthem of the Don Republic (1918–1920) and is currently the anthem of the Rostov Oblast, a federal subject of Russia. It was adopted on 10 October 1996. It was originally written by Fyodor Anisimov in 1853, during the beginning of the Crimean War. It is the symbol of the Don Cossacks, due to which the anthem is also referred to as the Anthem of the Don Cossacks.

Lyrics

Current lyrics 
These are the lyrics for the anthem of Rostov Oblast. They utilise the first, second and fifth verses of a set of lyrics written in 1917 or 1918, shortly after the February Revolution.

Note that the first two syllables of the first, second and fourth lines of each stanza and the last two lines of each stanza are repeated to follow the rhythmic composition.

Original lyrics

References

Russian anthems
Regional songs
National anthem compositions in G minor